Bidens populifolia, the Oahu beggarticks or poplar-leaved bidens,  is a species of flowering plant in the family Asteraceae. It belongs to the genus Bidens, collectively called kokoolau or kookoolau in the Hawaiian language. It is found only in the Koolau Range on Oahu.

Its natural habitat are montane tropical moist forests, tropical moist shrubland, and rocky areas. It is threatened by habitat loss due to the spread of invasive weeds and overgrazing.

References

populifolia
Endemic flora of Hawaii
Biota of Oahu
Taxonomy articles created by Polbot